The Bankruptcy Act 1967, is a Malaysian laws which enacted relating to the law of bankruptcy.

Structure
The Bankruptcy Act 1967, in its current form (1 January 2006), consists of 8 Parts containing 139 sections and 3 schedules (including 7 amendments).
Preliminary
Interpretation
Part I: Proceedings from Act of Bankruptcy to Discharge
Acts of Bankruptcy
Receiving Order
Proceedings consequent on Receiving Order
Public Examination of Debtor
Composition or Scheme of Arrangement
Adjudication of Bankruptcy
Control over Person and Property of Debtor
Discharge of Bankrupt
Part II: Disqualification and Disabilities of Bankrupt
Undischarged Bankrupt
Part III: Administration of Property
Proof of Debts
Property Available for Payment of Debts
Effect of Bankruptcy on Antecedent Transactions
Realization of Property
Distribution of Property
Part IV: Director General of Insolvency
Appointment
Duties
Costs
Receipts, Payments, Accounts, Audit
Release
Official Name
Vacation of Office on Insolvency
Additional Powers
Control
Part V: Constitution, Procedure and Powers of Court
Jurisdiction
Appeals
Procedure
Annulment of Adjudication
Part VI: Small Bankruptcies
Part VII: Fraudulent Debtors and Creditors
Part VIII: Supplemental Provisions
Application of Act
General Rules
Fees
Evidence
Notices
Formal Defects
Stamp Duty
Corporations, Firms and Mentally Disordered Persons
Unclaimed Funds or Dividends
Debtor’s Books
Repeals and Special Provisions
Schedules

See also
Bankruptcy Act

References

External links
 Bankruptcy Act 1967 

1967 in Malaysian law
Malaysian federal legislation